The Ultra Port Architecture (UPA) bus was developed by Sun Microsystems as a high-speed graphics card to CPU interconnect, beginning with the Ultra 1 workstation in 1995.

See also
List of device bandwidths

External links

 UPA Bus Whitepaper

Computer buses
Sun Microsystems hardware